Rod Phillips may refer to:
Rod Phillips (broadcaster) (born 1941), a Canadian radio sportscaster
Rod Phillips (American football) (born 1952), a former American football player with the  Los Angeles Rams and St. Louis Cardinals.
Rod Phillips (politician) (born 1965), a Canadian politician

See also
Rodney Phillips (1942-1969), New Zealand chess player